Michael Alan Spencer, Baron Spencer of Alresford (born 30 May 1955), sometimes known as "Spens", is a British billionaire businessman and philanthropist. He is the founder of NEX Group, a UK-based business focused on electronic markets and post-trade business which was acquired by CME Group in November 2018. NEX Group was formerly known as ICAP, until the sale of its voice-broking business to Tullett Prebon in December 2016.

Spencer was described in 2018 as the richest self-made person in the City of London and a "City grandee". According to the Sunday Times Rich List in 2021, he is worth an estimated £1.2 billion. He was awarded a peerage in August 2020 in the Political Honours List.

Education
Spencer was born in British Malaya. His father was an economist and international civil servant, his mother a linguist. During Spencer's early childhood, his family moved from his birth country to Sudan and then Ethiopia. Aged eight, he was sent to England to board, latterly at Worth School in Sussex. He read physics at Corpus Christi College, Oxford, after which he considered becoming an astrophysicist.

Spencer is an Honorary Fellow of Corpus Christi College, Oxford and an Honorary Doctor of Loughborough University.

Early career

In 1976, he joined city broker Simon and Coates. In 1981, he joined Drexel Burnham, rising to Vice President before being fired for trading errors. From 1983 to 1986 he was a Director at futures firm Charles Fulton; when that firm floated, Spencer used £50,000 from his proceeds to co-found his first business, along with three colleagues.

ICAP
Spencer co-founded Intercapital Brokers in 1986. Over its 20 years as a listed company, its total shareholder return was close to 6,000 per cent.

Intercapital was the first to launch a real-time screen that displayed live prices. In 1998, it was acquired by Exco in a reverse takeover, and the enlarged business was renamed Intercapital. In 1999, the company merged with Garban to create Garban-Intercapital, the largest inter-dealer broker in the world, with more than 5,000 employees across 63 offices. Garban renamed itself ICAP in 2001 (its full name did not fit on trading screens, hence the abbreviation to ICAP).

Functioning as an inter-dealer broker, ICAP brought together large financial institutions in search of buyers and sellers for corporate and government bonds, foreign currency, commodities and other financial products. The firm collected commissions and connected clients via its electronic trading platforms. In 2006 ICAP entered the FTSE 100, one of few companies to do so with a founder CEO.

Following the sale of its voice broking business to banking firm Tullett Prebon in December 2016, ICAP was renamed NEX Group, while Tullett Prebon became TP ICAP. Spencer sold the majority of his stake in TP ICAP in January 2017. He remains CEO and largest shareholder of Nex Group, as of February 2017.

In February 2010, Spencer made £45m from the sale of ICAP shares weeks before the company issued a profit warning that resulted in a 16% fall in the firm's share price.

In September 2013, ICAP was implicated in the global Libor interest rate scandal and fined $87m (£54m) by the US Commodity Futures Trading Commission and Britain's Financial Conduct Authority. In March 2014, British prosecutors filed charges against three former ICAP employees for their role in the affair. They were among a global group of finance professionals to be investigated, including staff from Barclays, UBS, Citigroup and RP Martin. In January 2016 the three ICAP employees were unanimously acquitted in the UK; the US Department of Justice dropped charges against the trio in July 2016. Spencer was not implicated but issued a public apology on behalf of ICAP.

In March 2018, NEX announced an approach by CME Group further to a proposed acquisition. CME Group offered £3.8bn in a cash-and-share deal, valuing Spencer's stake at approximately £668m. By the time the deal was completed in November 2018, Spencer's stake had grown to over £700m, half of which he received in cash, raising his net worth to over £1bn. As a listed company, NEX's total shareholder return was close to 6,000 per cent. Spencer serves as a CME Group Board Member and Special Advisor.

IPGL and other business interests 
Spencer holds stakes in numerous public and private companies.

Finance investments 
In 1997, Spencer purchased a controlling interest in spread betting firm City Index Group, acquiring his stake from the firm's founders. City Index was later sold for $118m to financial services company GAIN Capital, netting Spencer more than $80m.

He is Chairman, director and majority shareholder in IPGL, a private holding company making investments on behalf of Spencer and other family trusts. He is an early-stage investor in Temple Grange Partners, a consultancy that finds compliance specialists for financial markets. He is a co-owner of Exotix, a frontier markets investment banking boutique. He has led investment rounds in various fintech firms, including biometric authentication firm Veridium, file regeneration technology firm Glasswall Solutions and FX data analytics firm Tradefeedr.

In 2018, he became Chairman and majority shareholder of investment firm FCFM. He is an investor in Viewforth Investment Partners, a London-based hedge fund focusing on mid-cap European securities.

In 2021, Spencer became cornerstone investor in a $130m venture capital fund at Element Ventures, focusing on b2b financial enterprise technology. Spencer is the largest outside investor in Netwealth, a UK-based wealth management business. He also holds stakes in payment platform Klarna, wealth manager AJ Bell and online investment advisor Nutmeg.

Spencer is a former chairman of stockbroker Numis Securities. In 2019 he built up a 6% stake in the company.

In 2017, Spencer invested £54m in Singapore Life, an online savings platform for Singaporean and Asian markets. In 2020 his investment was reported to have doubled in value, upon the sale of Aviva's majority stake in the platform.

He believes in a long-term role for cryptocurrencies. He opposes MiFID II and has campaigned against tax surcharges on UK bank profits.

Spencer is an investor in Martin Gilbert's AssetCo.

Other investments 
Spencer owns a stake in Cluff Natural Resources, an energy resources investor.

In 2011, Spencer was made Chairman of Bordeaux Index, the online wine trading exchange in which he is an investor. He also holds a stake in English wine maker Chapel Down.

He is the owner of Sirai House, a commercial lodge in Kenya. He is reportedly an investor in British bookmaker The Tote.

Spencer is also an investor in various start-ups, including female health startup Elvie, human longevity firm Juvenescence and mobile gaming firm Probability.  In 2020 Spencer led a funding round for Superdielectrics, a firm developing technology to build supercapacitor energy storage for electric vehicles.

Politics
Spencer served as Treasurer of the Conservative Party from 2006 to 2010, during which time the party's finances moved from a deficit of £8m into a surplus of £75m. In 2020, he became Chairman of the Centre for Policy Studies, the think tank and pressure group founded by Margaret Thatcher. He is also Chairman of the Conservative Party Foundation, a company established to strengthen the financial future of the Conservative Party.

Spencer has been a donor to the Conservative Party. In 2012 it was reported that he maintained personal contact with the then Prime Minister David Cameron. ICAP and Spencer have made £4.6m in donations to the party although Spencer was critical of the May government's business policies; he has not donated to the party since the 2017 UK general election. Spencer was nominated for a peerage in Cameron's resignation honours list for charity fundraising and service to the Conservative Party while its treasurer, but reportedly, his nomination was blocked by the Cabinet Office.

Spencer has been reported to favour positive discrimination employment policies for women but is against gender-based employment quotas since he believes that they wrongly presuppose prejudice by all male employers. He has criticised the British government's pay gap review as a distraction from Brexit. Spencer was among the first to employ female brokers in the City.

He voted for the UK to remain in the EU. He later said that he had long been undecided on the issue and that his Remain vote was cast without "great angelical zeal". He has spoken of becoming a cheerleader for enterprise after the sale of NEX.

He was nominated for a life peerage in the 2020 Political Honours and created Baron Spencer of Alresford, of Alresford in the County of Hampshire on 17 September./ He made his maiden speech in November 2021, a year after he entered the Lords.

Awards and recognition 
 Entrepreneur of the Year at CNBC's European Business Leader Awards (2007) 
 Judges Special Award, Beacon Fellowship Prize (2007)
 2010 Ernst & Young World Entrepreneur Of The Year. Spencer was chosen from over 50 country finalists. 
 Queen's Award for International Trade (2005 and 2011)
 Institutional Investor's World's Top 50 Financial Technologists (number 13) (2016) 
 Lifetime Achievement Award, Futures & Options World (2016)

Philanthropy 
In 1993, Spencer founded the ICAP Charity Day, an annual event in which royalty and celebrities man the trading desks at ICAP and the broking firm donates the day's revenue to charities. As of February 2017, the event has raised over £140 million and backed 2,200 charitable projects. He has said that the Charity Day is his proudest achievement in business, alongside breaking into the FTSE100 with ICAP.

Various public individuals have manned the phones for Charity Day, including Prince William and Kate Middleton, Camilla, Duchess of Cornwall, Mo Farah, Chris Hoy,  George W. Bush, Samantha Cameron, Cheryl Cole, Tom Hardy, Halle Berry, Daniel Craig, and Chris Hemsworth.

Spencer is a founder and trustee of the Borana Conservation Trust, a charity which supports critically endangered species in Kenya's Borana and Laikipia regions.

The Spencer Family Foundation has backed a number of philanthropic initiatives, including a £1 million donation toward the British Normandy Memorial, dedicated to soldiers who died under British command during the Normandy landings. The Foundation also donated £100,000 to the Remember Me Covid memorial at St Paul's and a six-figure sum to the Mail Force campaign for PPE for hospitals, care homes and charities.

Personal life 
In 2008, Spencer divorced his first wife Lorraine. They had two sons and a daughter, and homes in Notting Hill, Suffolk and Manhattan.

In June 2016, Spencer married Sarah, Marchioness of Milford Haven in London, the daughter of George Alfred Walker and Jean Maureen (née Hatton), and former wife of George Mountbatten, 4th Marquess of Milford Haven – a second cousin of King Charles III.

Spencer has homes in Chelsea, London, and Kenya. Who's Who lists his hobbies as running, riding, shooting, wine and art; he is also reported to be an aviation enthusiast. Spencer runs a horse-breeding programme and plans to build a stable in Laikipia. His horse Freewheeler, a South African-bred colt, won the 2018 Kenya Derby at Ngong.

He collects twentieth century and contemporary art, including the work of Pablo Picasso, Lucian Freud and Jack Vettriano. Spencer is a former shareholder and an associate director of Ipswich Town Football Club. He is a Christian and churchgoer.

Spencer is a member of several London clubs, including White's, Beefsteak Club, 5 Hertford Street and 67 Pall Mall, as well as Muthaiga Country Club in Kenya.

References

External links 
 Big beast of the City hooked on the buzz of the markets The Observer, 14 May 2006

1955 births
Living people
20th-century British businesspeople
21st-century British businesspeople
Alumni of Corpus Christi College, Oxford
British financial businesspeople
British financiers
British company founders
British technology company founders
British investors
British venture capitalists
Charity fundraisers (people)
Conservative Party (UK) donors
Conservative Party (UK) people
English businesspeople
English financial businesspeople
English financial company founders
English philanthropists
Life peers
People educated at Worth School
Life peers created by Elizabeth II